The 2018 ManBetX Welsh Open was a professional ranking snooker tournament, that took place from 26 February to 4 March 2018 at the Motorpoint Arena in Cardiff, Wales. It was the sixteenth ranking event of the 2017/2018 season and a part of the Home Nations Series.

The defending champion Stuart Bingham lost 1–4 to Matthew Stevens in the last 32.

John Higgins won a record fifth Welsh Open title, and his 30th ranking title overall, beating Barry Hawkins 9–7 in the final.

Prize fund
The breakdown of prize money for this year is shown below:

 Winner: £70,000
 Runner-up: £30,000
 Semi-final: £20,000
 Quarter-final: £10,000
 Last 16: £6,000
 Last 32: £3,500
 Last 64: £2,500

Highest break: £2,000
Total: £366,000

The "rolling 147 prize" for a maximum break stood at £20,000

Main draw

Qualifying round 
 Rhydian Richards 4–3  Darren Morgan

Top half

Section 1

Section 2

Section 3

Section 4

Bottom half

Section 5

Section 6

Section 7

Section 8

Finals

Final

Century breaks

Total: 66

 144, 141, 138, 136, 115,113, 107, 106, 101, 100  John Higgins
 143, 100  Mark Selby
 141, 138, 137, 130, 103  Barry Hawkins
 141, 110  Martin Gould
 140, 124, 105, 101  Gary Wilson
 139, 120, 102  Noppon Saengkham
 136, 105, 100, 100  Kyren Wilson
 134, 129, 106  Mark Williams
 133, 117, 106, 100  Ronnie O'Sullivan
 131, 106  Ian Burns
 131, 101  Thepchaiya Un-Nooh
 130, 100, 100  Neil Robertson
 129, 115  Elliot Slessor
 129  Ben Woollaston
 124  Cao Yupeng
 119, 116  Mark Allen
 118  Zhang Anda
 118  Stuart Bingham
 115  Liam Highfield
 114, 104, 104, 103  Jack Lisowski
 111, 108  Sunny Akani
 111  Robbie Williams
 110  Yan Bingtao
 107  Ryan Day
 104  Mark King
 103  Kurt Dunham
 102  Gerard Greene
 102  Stephen Maguire

References

Home Nations Series
2018
2018 in snooker
2018 in Welsh sport
February 2018 sports events in the United Kingdom
March 2018 sports events in the United Kingdom
Sports competitions in Cardiff